Body modification (or body alteration) is the deliberate altering of the human anatomy or human physical appearance.  In its broadest definition it includes skin tattooing, socially acceptable decoration (e.g., common ear piercing in many societies), and religious rites of passage (e.g., circumcision in a number of cultures), as well as the modern primitive movement.

Body modification is performed for a large variety of reasons, including aesthetics, sexual enhancement, rites of passage, religious beliefs, to display group membership or affiliation, in remembrance of lived experience, traditional symbolism such as axis mundi and mythology, to create body art, for shock value, and as self-expression, among other reasons.

Definition 
 
What counts as "body modification" varies in cultures. In western cultures, the cutting or removal of one's hair is not usually considered body modification.

Body modification can be contrasted with body adornment by defining body modification as “the physical alteration of the physical body [...] can be temporary or permanent, although most are permanent and modify the body forever”

History

Non-consensual body modification
"Disfigurement" and "mutilation" (regardless of any appreciation this always applies objectively whenever a bodily function is gravely diminished or lost) are terms used by opponents of body modification to describe certain types of modifications, especially non-consensual ones. Those terms are used fairly uncontroversially to describe the victims of torture, who have endured damage to ears, eyes, feet, genitalia, hands, noses, teeth, and/or tongues, including amputation, burning, flagellation, piercing, skinning, and wheeling.

Some invasive procedures that modify human genitals are performed with the informed consent of the patient, using anesthesia or sterilised surgical tools The phrase "genital mutilation" is sometimes used to describe procedures that individuals are forced to undergo castration, male circumcision, and female genital mutilation in this way. Intersex campaigners say that childhood modification of genitals of individuals with intersex conditions without their informed consent is a form of mutilation.

See also

Adornment
Bioethics
Blood ritual
Bodyhacking
Church of Body Modification
Deformity
Eyeborg
First haircut
Genital tattooing
Human enhancement
Leblouh
List of body modifications
List of people known for extensive body modification
Makeup
Microchip implant (human)
Modern primitive
Morphological freedom

References

 
Cultural trends
Underground culture